Harry S Truman High School (often referred to as HST or simply Truman), formerly Woodrow Wilson High School, is a public high school located in Levittown, Pennsylvania. The school is a part of the Bristol Township School District in Bristol Township, Bucks County, Pennsylvania, and is its only high school. It was named after US President Harry S Truman. The principal is Jon Craig.

Academics

AP level courses
Harry S Truman High School has historically offered the various Advanced Placement (AP) level classes, including U.S. history, U.S. government and politics, chemistry, English literature, statistics, and calculus AB (though BC has been offered to particularly advanced students). The school also offers Project Lead the Way courses that result as college credits. Those include Intro to Digital Electronics, Intro to Engineering Design, Principles of Engineering & Civil & Architectural Engineering. HST won an AP Honor Roll award for their distinguished scholars for the years 2011-2012, besting other school districts in the area.

Language instruction
Truman offers five years of instruction in Italian and Spanish. It also has an English as a Second Language (ESL) program and often hosts international students who are studying abroad in the United States.

NJROTC
Harry S Truman HS was a pilot school for the United States Navy's Junior Reserve Officers Training Corps program. The Harry S Truman NJROTC unit was active from 1968 until 1996. It was the first JROTC unit to admit female cadets.

Activities

Debate 

Truman has a speech and debate team. The team competes in the National Speech and Debate Association (Valley Forge district), the Philadelphia Catholic Forensic League, the Southeastern Pennsylvania Debate League, the Pennsylvania High School Speech League (district 12), and at numerous national and regional invitationals.

Drama
Truman's drama program was led by Louis Volpe for about 45 years until his retirement in June 2013. In October 2012, the Bristol Township School Board approved a resolution that would name Truman’s auditorium after Volpe. After the departure of Volpe, Tracey Gatte assumed the position of director after being assistant director for several years.

The program chose to pioneer Les Misérables for high school use in 2001. They also performed the pilot of the student editions of Rent and Spring Awakening. Other Truman productions have included Beauty and the Beast, Aida, Epic Proportions, Godspell, Jesus Christ Superstar, Equus, Found a Peanut, Grease, and most recently performed the first ever highschool production of Kinky Boots.

Author Michael Sokolove wrote the book Drama High, which focuses on the life of Lou Volpe and history of the Truman theater program. Drama High was adapted into the 2018 NBC series Rise.

Sports

All Truman teams compete in the Suburban One League of Levittown, Pennsylvania.

Truman's basketball program have won Suburban I championships in 2001, 2004, and 2005. They have also reached the State Playoff Tournament for AAAA schools in 2005 and 2006. The team coach is Allan Flowerford. Tyrone Lewis graduated from Truman, where he was senior class president and record-setting basketball player.

Field hockey
Truman's varsity field hockey team is coached by Kayla Kowalick; the junior varsity team is coached by Jess Shultz. The field hockey team has a growing program. Opponent teams include: Pennsbury, Neshaminy, Abington, and both Council Rock teams.

Football
Truman football teams have "strong" rivalries with Conwell-Egan, Pennsbury, and Bensalem. Their win–loss record was 2-10 in 2008 and showed improvement in 2009, 3-8, under old head football coach John M. Lannuccini. Coach Lannuccini resigned days before the first game of the 2010 season. Truman now has a new head coach - Jon Craig, and had its best season in over 30 years in 2014. Coach Craig resigned after the 2016 season and the reins were handed over to the former Pennsbury Coach Michael Lapalambara. During the 2017 season, The Tigers had made it to the playoffs for the first time since 1993. For the 2019 season Truman has a new head coach, Ben Johnson.

Lacrosse
Truman's lacrosse team was founded during the 2000–01 academic year. It has both a varsity and junior varsity squad.

Bowling 
Truman’s female bowling team won the SOL Title for the 2016–17, 2017–18, 2018–19, and 2019-20 years and has been undefeated the last 3 years. They have also won the state championship in 2019. The boys team has won the SOL Title in 2019-20. This sport is coached by Jess Schultz (girls team) and Mike Hackbart (boys team).

Notable alumni
Susan Barnett, newsreader
Rick DeJesus, musician
Kevin Ingram, former arena football player
Earl "The Twirl" Williams, former American-Israeli basketball player

References

External links

Official website of Bristol Township, Pennsylvania

Public high schools in Pennsylvania
Schools in Bucks County, Pennsylvania